A moonlet, minor moon, minor natural satellite, or minor satellite is a particularly small natural satellite orbiting a planet, dwarf planet, or other minor planet.

Up until 1995, moonlets were only hypothetical components of Saturn's F-ring structure, but in that year, the Earth passed through Saturn's ring plane. The Hubble Space Telescope and the European Southern Observatory both captured objects orbiting close or near the F-ring.  In 2004, Cassini caught an object 4–5 kilometers in diameter on the outer ring of the F-ring and then 5 hours later on the inner F-ring, showing that the object had orbited.

Three different types of small moons have been called moonlets:
 A belt of objects embedded in a planetary ring, especially around Saturn, such as those in the A Ring, S/2009 S 1 in the B Ring ("propeller" moonlets), and those in the F Ring
 Occasionally asteroid moons, such as those of 87 Sylvia
 Flashes seen near Jupiter's moon Amalthea that is likely debris ejected from its surface
 Subsatellites

See also

 Minor-planet moon
 Natural satellite
 Ring system

References

Further reading
Google Book Search for "moonlet"

Asteroid satellites
Moons of Saturn
Moons